The 1999–2000 Penn Quakers men's basketball team represented the University of Pennsylvania during the 1999–2000 NCAA Division I men's basketball season. The Quakers, led by 11th-year head coach Fran Dunphy, played their home games at The Palestra as members of the Ivy League. They finished the season 21–8, 14–0 in Ivy League play to win the regular season championship. They received the Ivy League's automatic bid to the NCAA tournament where they lost in the First Round to Illinois.

Roster

Schedule and results

|-
!colspan=9 style=| Regular season

|-
!colspan=9 style=| NCAA tournament

Awards and honors
Michael-Hakim Jordan – Ivy League Player of the Year
Ugonna Onyekwe – Ivy League Rookie of the Year

References

Penn Quakers men's basketball seasons
Penn
Penn
Penn
Penn